The 1980 Nebraska Cornhuskers football team represented the University of Nebraska–Lincoln in the 1980 NCAA Division I-A football season. The team was coached by Tom Osborne and played their home games in Memorial Stadium in Lincoln, Nebraska.

Schedule

Roster

Depth chart

Coaching staff

Game summaries

Utah

Nebraska racked up 545 yards on the ground, the second-highest total in school history, as IB Jarvis Redwine averaged over 10 yards per carry before leaving the game in the hands of capable reserves.  Utah suffered from two interceptions, and the sole Utes touchdown didn't get punched in until Cornhusker backups were on the field in the 4th quarter for playing time.

Iowa

Nebraska completely shut down Iowa's heralded runner Jeff Brown, putting to rest Iowa's hope for a rushing contest with Nebraska IB Jarvis Redwine.  Redwine left the game shortly after halftime after collecting 153 yards on 12 attempts, while Brown added only 51 to his career total during the entire game.  Other Iowa rushing attempts went the other way, and the Hawkeye ground total netted only 44 yards as the Cornhuskers allowed Iowa into Nebraska territory only twice in the entire game on their way to delivering a painful 57-0 shutout.

Penn State

The Blackshirts were the stars of this day in front of a record crowd at State College, as the Nebraska defense sacked Penn State QB Jeff Hostetler eight times for 89 yards, and forced seven turnovers, keeping the Nittany Lions constantly on their heels and away from any hope of an upset.  Penn State managed just one touchdown, in the 2nd quarter, and accumulated a net rushing total of only 33 yards.

Florida State

Trailing by 4 points as the clock wound down under 15 seconds, Nebraska QB Jeff Quinn was hit only three yards from the end zone, forcing a fumble which was recovered by Florida State.  The Seminoles escaped Lincoln with a win, and the Cornhuskers lost IB Jarvis Redwine for two weeks due to broken ribs, along with their hopes for an undefeated season. Husker fans, impressed by FSU's tenacity, gave a spontaneous standing ovation to the visiting team, starting a new tradition at Memorial Stadium.

Kansas

The temporary loss of IB Jarvis Redwine to injury presented no difficulties to the Big Red Machine, as Nebraska steamrolled Kansas in Lawrence, chalking up 33 points in the 1st half alone.  By the end of the game, the Blackshirts had posted another shutout to their stats while the Cornhusker offense rolled up 520 yards of offense and 54 points.

Oklahoma State

The Nebraska defense saw their string of touchdown-prevention quarters ended at 8 when Oklahoma State managed to squeak in a touchdown in the 3rd quarter, but that was all that would be heard from the Cowboys on this day since they were held to -13 ground yards compared to the 430 ground yards posted by the Cornhuskers.

Colorado

The return of Nebraska IB Jarvis Redwine was short-lived, as both he and 2nd string IB Craig Johnson left the game with injuries in the 1st quarter.  3rd string IB Roger Craig was still too much for Colorado as Nebraska swept up the Buffaloes in Boulder while collecting 403 ground yards and a decisive 45-7 win, the 13th Cornhusker win in a row over Colorado, whose only score came in the 4th quarter against Nebraska reserves.

Missouri

Nebraska created a 15-point lead by halftime and never looked back, though Missouri was not to be trifled with.  Where the Cornhuskers made their gains on the ground, the Tigers achieved their yards in the air, but at the end of the game it was still the Cornhuskers well ahead and celebrating their first win over Missouri in Memorial Stadium since 1972.

Kansas State

Kansas State was demolished in Lincoln in every way, as Nebraska racked up 495 yards on the ground and pushed both the 1st and 2nd string Wildcat quarterbacks backwards for a combined -67 yard net on the day.  The normally ground-oriented Cornhuskers also dominated in the air, nearly doubling the Wildcat passing yard total and bringing the Nebraska yardage total to 695.  Kansas State scored a single touchdown and capped it with a two-point conversion with just 1:52 left on the clock in garbage time, narrowly avoiding the shutout.

Iowa State

Compared with the week prior, Nebraska had a slow start, leading by only 14 at the half, and that only when a Cornhusker punt was fumbled by the Cyclone returner into the end zone and recovered by the Cornhuskers to add 7 to the total with 2:28 left in the half.  Nonetheless, the Nebraska offense simply kept powering along, wearing down the Iowa State squad until they surrendered another 21 points, while the Blackshirts held the Cyclone offense to just 130 total yards and no points.

Oklahoma

The Cornhuskers had a promising start, as IB Jarvis Redwine tore the Sooner defense for an 89-yard touchdown run on Nebraska's first possession and PK Kevin Seibel put a 47 yarder through the uprights to go up by 10, but Oklahoma came to life to lead 14-10 by halftime.  Nebraska held the Oklahoma wishbone attack to just 7 yards in the 3rd quarter, but also gave up a couple of turnovers which proved costly as both teams put up only another touchdown each before the game was over with Oklahoma still up by 4 to claim the Big 8 title.

Mississippi State

Nebraska marked their 12th consecutive bowl game appearance by striking first with 7 points only 2:30 into the first quarter.  It was not a major record-setting day, but consistent production and solid ball control provided the Cornhuskers with ample opportunities to produce points.  The Bulldogs found themselves behind 17–0 at the half and never had an opportunity to make any serious threat to the Cornhuskers again.

Rankings

Awards

NFL and pro players
The following Nebraska players who participated in the 1980 season later moved on to the next level and joined a professional or semi-pro team as draftees or free agents.

References

Nebraska
Nebraska Cornhuskers football seasons
Sun Bowl champion seasons
Nebraska Cornhuskers football